Cyrenida is an extinct genus of clams in the family Cyrenidae. This name is now accepted as a synonym of Corbicula Megerle von Mühlfeld, 1811.

Species
Species within this genus include:
†Cyrena abbreviata Deshayes 1857
†Cyrena cardioides Deshayes 1857
†Cyrena consobrina Cailland 1823
†Cyrena difficilis Deshayes 1860
†Cyrena distincta Deshayes 1857
†Cyrena dutemplei Deshayes 1857
†Cyrena gravesi Deshayes 1824
†Cyrena incompta Deshayes 1857
†Cyrena lamberti Deshayes 1857
†Cyrena nobilis Deshayes 1857
†Cyrena saincenyensis Deshayes 1857
†Cyrena sirena Brongniart
†Cyrena veneriformis Deshayes 1857

Fossils within this genus can be found in sediment of Europe, the United States, Colombia, Peru, Panama and Tanzania from the Jurassic to the Quaternary (age range: 189.6 to 0.781 Ma).

References

External links 
 Geobiota

Prehistoric bivalve genera
Cyrenidae